Meredith McGrath and Larisa Savchenko were the defending champions but only Savchenko competed that year with Brenda Schultz-McCarthy.

Savchenko and Schultz-McCarthy lost in the final 4–6, 6–3, 7–6 against Nicole Arendt and Manon Bollegraf.

Seeds
Champion seeds are indicated in bold text while text in italics indicates the round in which those seeds were eliminated.

 Larisa Savchenko /  Brenda Schultz-McCarthy (final)
 Nicole Arendt /  Manon Bollegraf (champions)
 Yayuk Basuki /  Caroline Vis (first round)
 Sabine Appelmans /  Miriam Oremans (first round)

Draw

External links
 1997 Faber Grand Prix Doubles Draw

Faber Grand Prix
1997 WTA Tour